In 1996, a split 10" EP was released on Misanthropy Records consisting of one song each from Primordial and Katatonia. Primordial recorded a new version (often referred to as the "MCMXCVI" version of the song) of an old demo song, at Academy Studios in Yorkshire, exclusively for this release. Katatonia's song was recorded at Unisound Studios in Finspång, in February 1994. The EP was available only on purple vinyl format, limited to 777 copies.

Track listing

Personnel

Katatonia 

 Jonas Renkse – vocals, drums
 Blackheim – guitar
 Le Huche (Guillaume Le Huche) – bass

Production 

 Dan Swanö – mixing, engineering, production
 Katatonia – production

Notes
Katatonia's song was later featured on the Saw You Drown EP in 1998.
Primordial's song marks the final performance of the band's original drummer, Derek "D." MacAmlaigh.

Split EPs
1996 EPs
Primordial (band) albums
Katatonia EPs